Australia will participate at the 2024 Summer Paralympics in Paris, France, from 28 August to 8 September 2024.

In June 2022, Paralympics Australia announced Kate McLoughlin as the Chef de Mission, her third Summer Paralympics in this role.

References

External links 
 Official website

Nations at the 2024 Summer Paralympics
2024
2024 in Australian sport